This is a list of ministers of the Federal Capital Territory of Nigeria.
The Federal Capital Territory was formed in 1976 from parts of former Nasarawa, Niger, and Kogi States.

See also
Federal Capital Territory Administration
States of Nigeria
List of state governors of Nigeria

References

Federal Capital Territory
Ministers
Federal Capital Territory ministers
Chigudu Theophilus Tanko: A historical study of the emergence of FCT in Nigeria